Class 450 may refer to:

British Rail Class 450, an electric multiple unit type operated by South Western Railway
NIR Class 450, a diesel multiple unit type operated by Northern Ireland Railways